Hendrik Degros (born 25 April 1975) is a Belgian equestrian. He competed in two events at the 2004 Summer Olympics.

References

External links
 

1975 births
Living people
Belgian male equestrians
Olympic equestrians of Belgium
Equestrians at the 2004 Summer Olympics
Sportspeople from Hasselt
21st-century Belgian people